"Pyramid" in the context of ancient architecture primarily refers to the Egyptian pyramids (see List of Egyptian pyramids).
Various other structures built in antiquity have also been called pyramids:

Mesoamerican step pyramids; see Mesoamerican pyramids
 Chinese pyramids
Mesopotamian Ziggurats
 The Nubian pyramids, Sudan
 The Pyramid of Hellinikon, Greece
 The Pyramid of Gaius Cestius, Porta San Paolo, Rome
 The Star Pyramid or Pulemelei Mound, Samoa
 The Peruvian Pyramids

See also
Lepsius list of pyramids
Pyramidology
Pyramid (disambiguation)
French pyramids (modern structures)
 The Pyramids of Güímar (modern structures)
"Bosnian pyramids" (not man-made structures)